Raigamacharige Nilanjana (born March 20, 1975) was a Sri Lankan cricketer. He was a left-handed batsman and leg-break bowler who played for Kalutara Town Club. He was born in Colombo.

Nilanjana made seven appearances for the team during the 1996-97 Saravanamuttu Trophy campaign, Kalutara's only season in first-class cricket. Debuting in their first match from the upper-middle order, Nilanjana was quickly placed lower down the order as he was unable to partner teammate Saman Fonseka effectively.

At no point a frequent bowler within the team, Nilanjana bowled just nine overs in his first-class career, which stretched to seven matches of the team's thirteen, none of which ended in victory.

External links
Raigamacharige Nilanjana at CricketArchive 

1975 births
Living people
Sri Lankan cricketers
Kalutara Town Club cricketers